I Don't Wanna Dance is a 2021 Dutch drama film directed by Flynn Von Kleist. The film is based on the real-life experiences of lead actor Yfendo van Praag. Von Kleist already made the 2017 short documentary Omdat ik Yfendo heet and the 2018 short film Crows Nest about this subject. The film premiered at the Movies That Matter Festival in The Hague.

Plot 
A young dancer moves back with his destructive mother.

References

External links 
 

2021 films
Dutch drama films
2020s Dutch-language films
2021 drama films